
This is a list of the 28 players who earned their 2009 PGA Tour card through Q School in 2008.

Players in yellow are 2009 PGA Tour rookies.

2009 Results

*PGA Tour rookie in 2009
T = Tied 
Green background indicates the player retained his PGA Tour card for 2010 (finished inside the top 125). 
Yellow background indicates the player did not retain his PGA Tour card for 2010, but retained conditional status (finished between 126-150). 
Red background indicates the player did not retain his PGA Tour card for 2010 (finished outside the top 150).

Winners on the PGA Tour in 2009

Runner-up on the PGA Tour in 2009

See also
2008 Nationwide Tour graduates

References
All information from here.
Player profiles
Money list

PGA Tour Qualifying School
PGA Tour Qualifying School Graduates
PGA Tour Qualifying School Graduates